JIM (launched as JIMtv in 2001) was a Flemish television channel of the Medialaan (Now DPG Media) that is aimed at people aged between 15 and 24. Its name is a backronym for "Jong, Interactief en Meer" (English: Young, Interactive and More). During its first years, the channel mainly broadcast music videos. They have since started mixing this with programs such as Brainiac and Snoop Dogg's Father Hood. The channel stopped broadcasting on December 16, 2015.

History 
The cradle of JIMtv were Jo Nachtergaele, Michael Dujardin, Peter Hoogland, Frank Molnar, Serge Jespers and Inge Tossyn. They were responsible for the content, the channel look and positioning of JIMtv. The first broadcast on April 2, 2001 started with "God Is A DJ" by Faithless followed by an introductory program in which all people and behind the scenes themselves were submitted. On April 2, 2006, the channel celebrated its fifth anniversary.

Nowadays the channel is just called JIM. Originally, the letter combination 'JIM' stood for "Jong, Interactief en Meer" (English: Young, Interactive and More). The suffix 'TV' was omitted because VMMa (later called Medialaan from 2014-2018, now DPG Media) initially also wanted to set up a radio station called JIMfm, but those plans were abandoned. In November 2001 VMMa launched still a radio station: Q-music.

On September 15, 2015 Medialaan announced that JIM would cease broadcasting on December 16, 2015. The vacant channel is filled by a new children's channel Kadet from December 19, 2015, which focuses primarily on boys between 8 and 12 years old.

VJs 
In 2015 Niko Van Driessche, Britt Valkenborghs, Vincent Banic, Elisa Guarraci and Jolien De Greef were the VJs of service.

Logos

Events

Jimmies 
Since 2012 JIM presented annually in February his own playful prizes, De Jimmies (officially JIM awards), in a variety of musical and other mediatic categories:
 best film, the faux pas of the year, person of the year, best game
 the musical in every national and international versions: best group, best newcomer, best clip, best singer, best female singer.

Livestream 
Since the logo of JIM and the full range of programs was changed on October 11, 2010, one can now watch JIM live via JIM website.

Radio station 
Originally, the VMMa was planning on launching a youth radio station called JIMfm as a complement to JIMtv. These plans were later dropped.

References

External links 
 JIM

Music television channels
Television channels in Flanders
Television channels in Belgium
Television channels and stations established in 2001
Vilvoorde
Music organisations based in Belgium